Mushin in Japanese and Wuxin in Chinese (無心 "no mind") is a mental state. Zen and Daoist meditators attempt to reach this state, as well as artists and trained martial artists. They also practice this mental state during everyday activities.

Etymology
The term contains the character for negation, "not" or "without" (無), along with the character for heart-mind (心). That is, a mind not fixed or occupied by thought or emotion and thus open to everything. It is translated by D.T. Suzuki as "being free from mind-attachment".

Description
Mushin is achieved when a person's mind is free from thoughts of anger, fear, or ego during combat or everyday life.  There is an absence of discursive thought and judgment, so the person is totally free to act and react towards an opponent without hesitation and without disturbance from such thoughts.  At this point, a person relies not on what they think should be the next move, but what is their trained natural reaction (or instinct) or what is felt intuitively. It is not a state of relaxed, near-sleepfulness, however. The mind could be said to be working at a very high speed, but with no intention, plan or direction.

Some masters believe that mushin is the state where a person finally understands the uselessness of techniques and becomes truly free to move. In fact, those people will no longer even consider themselves as "fighters" but merely living beings moving through space.

On page 84 of his 1979 book Zen in the Martial Arts, Joe Hyams claimed Bruce Lee read the following quote to him, attributed to the legendary Zen master Takuan Sōhō:

The mind must always be in the state of 'flowing,' for when it stops anywhere that means the flow is interrupted and it is this interruption that is injurious to the well-being of the mind. In the case of the swordsman, it means death. 
When the swordsman stands against his opponent, he is not to think of the opponent, nor of himself, nor of his enemy's sword movements. He just stands there with his sword which, regardless of all technique, is ready only to follow the dictates of the subconscious. The man has effaced himself as the wielder of the sword. When he strikes, it is not the man but the sword in the hand of the man's subconscious that strikes.

Applications
However, mushin is not just a state of mind that can be achieved during combat.  Many martial artists train to achieve this state of mind during kata so that a flawless execution of moves is learned and may be repeated at any other time. Once mushin is attained through the practice or study of martial arts (although it can be accomplished through other arts or practices that refine the mind and body), the objective is to then attain this same level of complete awareness in other aspects of the practitioner's life. Dr Robert Akita claims it helps him "listen to my wife and children more closely...especially when I disagree with them, [and] in my business it has helped when I am faced with difficult decisions...."

See also

 Flow (psychology)
 Wu wei
 Sahaja
 Samyama
 Fudōshin
 Mokuso
 Shoshin
 Unconscious mind
 Zanshin
 Zen Buddhism

References

Japanese martial arts terminology
Zen